Carceri is a comune (municipality) in the Province of Padua in the Italian region Veneto, located about  southwest of Venice and about  southwest of Padua. Its name means "prison" in Italian.

Carceri borders the following municipalities: Este, Ospedaletto Euganeo, Ponso, Vighizzolo d'Este.

Demographic evolution

References

Cities and towns in Veneto